Clarence Henry (27 March 1926 – 28 February 1999) was an American boxer who won the 1948 Golden Gloves Tournament of Champions and was a highly ranked heavyweight contender during the 1950s.

Career
Born in San Antonio, Texas and raised in Los Angeles, Henry won the 1948 Los Angeles Times Golden Gloves heavyweight championship, going on to win the national Golden Gloves championship in Chicago that year.  In April 1948, he defeated Belgian Fernand Bothy as part the Chicago Golden Gloves Team representing the United States.

Henry was small for a heavyweight but had an explosive punch.  Fighting out of Los Angeles, he won the Heavyweight Championship of California and the Heavyweight Championship of the Pacific Coast. On June 26, 1952, Henry fought Archie Moore six months before Moore won the light-heavyweight title from Joey Maxim. Weighing 184¾ lbs. to Moore's 176 lbs., he lost a unanimous decision in 10 rounds at Baltimore's Memorial Stadium. At his peak, he was the third-ranked heavyweight contender.

Arrest and retirement
In 1949, former heavyweight champ Jack Dempsey became his manager, though gangster  Frank "Blinky" Palermo eventually owned his contract. On June 4, 1954, Henry was arrested in New York City for attempting to bribe Oakland, California middleweight Bobby Jones to throw his June 11 match in Madison Square Garden with Joey Giardello of Philadelphia, a future world's middleweight champion. Henry allegedly offered $15,000 (equivalent to approximately $ in today's funds) to Jones to throw the fight, which Giardello subsequently won in a close decision. He retired from the ring that year.

Legacy
Clarence Henry was elected to the World Boxing Hall of Fame in 1998, the year before his death.

Championships and accomplishments
Cauliflower Alley Club
Boxing Honoree (1992)

References

1926 births
1999 deaths
African-American boxers
Sportspeople from San Antonio
Boxers from Los Angeles
Sportspeople involved in betting scandals
National Golden Gloves champions
American male boxers
Boxers from Texas
Heavyweight boxers
20th-century African-American sportspeople